Adnan Abdo Al Sukhni (born 1961) is a Syrian politician who has been serving as industry minister since August 2012.

Education
Sukhni was born in Aleppo in 1961. He received a PhD in electrical engineering from the University of Charles in the Republic of Czechoslovakia.

Career
Sukhni served at Syria's People's Assembly for three terms. From 2010 to 2012, he was the governor of Raqqa Governorate. He was appointed industry minister to the cabinet headed by Prime Minister Wael Al Halaqi on 16 August 2012.

Sanctions
On 15 October 2012, Sukhni was added to the European Union's sanction list on the grounds that as a cabinet minister, he "shares responsibility for the regime’s violent repression against the civilian population."

On 16 May 2013, the United States Treasury Department designated four senior Syrian officials, including Sukhni, for "backing the regime of Bashar Assad in suppressing people or involvement in terrorism."

References

1961 births
Arab Socialist Ba'ath Party – Syria Region politicians
Living people
People from Aleppo
Syrian engineers
Syrian ministers of industry